Ed Jones (born June 29, 1952) is a former American and canadian football safety for the Edmonton Eskimos and BC Lions of the Canadian Football League (CFL). He won five Grey Cups for the Eskimos and was a CFL All-Star. He also was a member of the Buffalo Bills in the National Football League (NFL). He played college football at Rutgers University and was drafted by the Dallas Cowboys in 1975.

Early years
Jones grew up in Middletown Township, New Jersey and didn't play organized football until attending Middletown Township High School in Navesink, New Jersey. He was a two-way player (running back and defensive back) that also was a key special teams performer. 

In 1969, before the state championships were played, he led his team to a 14–8 upset over Toms River South High School, by returning a 67-yard kickoff to set up a touchdown run and intercepting a pass to seal the win. The team finished with a 9–0 record. He received All-state honors as a senior.

College career
Jones accepted a football scholarship from Rutgers University. As a sophomore, he was switched from running back to defense during the season, earning the starting position at left cornerback, collecting 3 interceptions and 16 kickoff returns for 315 yards. He also practiced track, competing in the 100 and 220 metres.

As a junior in 1972, he was redshirted with an injured shoulder. In 1973, he was second on the team with 4 interceptions and also returned 5 kickoffs for 90 yards. 

As a senior in 1974, he led the team with 7 interceptions and received All-East honors. His career interception total (14) tied the school record set by John Pollock in 1968.

In 1990, he was inducted into the Rutgers Athletics Hall of Fame.

Professional career

Dallas Cowboys
Jones was selected by the Dallas Cowboys in the ninth round (226th overall) of the 1975 NFL Draft, also known as the Dirty Dozen draft. He was released before the start of the season on August 11.

Buffalo Bills
On August 14, 1975, he was claimed off waivers by the Buffalo Bills. He played in 12 games (11 starts) at strong safety, while missing 2 games with an arm injury. He registered 3 interceptions, one fumble recovery and received NFL All-rookie honors. On September 7, 1976, he was released, with some in the media reporting that a contract dispute was part of the reasoning.

Edmonton Eskimos
In 1976, he was signed by the Edmonton Eskimos of the Canadian Football League after a five-day trial. He played in the last four regular-season games and in two playoff games. He was coached by Hugh Campbell and earned a reputation as one of the hardest hitters in the league.

Jones was selected 4 times to the West All-Stars (1978, 1979, 1980 and 1981) as well as 3 times to the CFL All-Stars (1979, 1980 and 1981). In 1980 he had his best season, leading the CFL with 10 interceptions (3 returned for touchdowns).

He helped the team win 5 Grey Cups during his nine-year career, finishing with 30 career interceptions, 5 fumble recoveries and 3.5 sacks. On March 12, 1984, he was traded to the BC Lions in exchange for a third-round draft pick in the 1985 CFL Draft.

BC Lions
In 1984, he played in only 9 games because of torn cartilage in his right knee and recorded one interception. He was placed on the reserve list on October 19.

Personal life
After his retirement, he worked in Edmonton's City Hall to provide affordable housing in the city. He served as the vice-president of the Eskimos Alumni.

In the 2014 CFL Draft, his son Derek was selected in the fourth round (29th overall) by the Winnipeg Blue Bombers.

References

External links
Ex-Eskimo hard hitter now throws his weight into housing the poor

1952 births
Living people
Middletown High School North alumni
Sportspeople from Long Branch, New Jersey
People from Middletown Township, New Jersey
Players of American football from New Jersey
American football defensive backs
American players of Canadian football
Rutgers Scarlet Knights football players
Rutgers Scarlet Knights men's track and field athletes
Buffalo Bills players
Edmonton Elks players
BC Lions players
Canadian football defensive backs
Sportspeople from Monmouth County, New Jersey